Synaptics is a limited edition EP by German electronica band Mouse on Mars. It was released on 13 October 2017 by Monkeytown Records in only 300 copies. It features experiments with juke and dubstep style and contributions from Jessy Lanza, Modeselektor and Sepalcure among others.

Track listing
All tracks written and composed by Jan St. Werner and Andi Toma, except where noted:

Personnel 
 Design – Frieda Luczak
 Vocals – Jessy Lanza (tracks: B1)
 Writing, production – Andi Toma (tracks: 1, 2, 3), Jan St. Werner (tracks: 1, 2, 3), Jeremy Greenspan (tracks: 2), Jessy Lanza (track 2), Praveen Sharma (track 3), Travis Stewart (track 3)

References

External links
 
 EP as Soundcloud playlist

2017 EPs
Mouse on Mars albums
Thrill Jockey EPs